Ball v. United States,    163 U.S. 662 (1896), is one of the earliest United States Supreme Court cases interpreting the Double Jeopardy Clause.

In 1889, defendants Millard Fillmore Ball, John C. Ball, and Robert E. Boutwell were indicted for the murder of William T. Box. The jury acquitted Millard Fillmore Ball and convicted John C. Ball and Robert E. Boutwell. The convicted defendants appealed to the Supreme Court, which reversed their convictions in 1891, holding that the indictment was insufficient. All three were indicted for the murder a second time. All three plead prior jeopardy. The trial court rejected all three pleas, and all three were convicted the second time.

On the second appeal, the Supreme Court reversed Millard Fillmore Ball's conviction. Departing from the common law rule of England, and from early decisions of the state supreme courts of New York and Massachusetts, the Court held that—under the Double Jeopardy Clause—the insufficiency of the first indictment could not remove the jeopardy bar of acquittal, as long as the first court had jurisdiction.

The Court rejected John C. Ball and Robert E. Boutwell's double jeopardy arguments, holding that they could be retried after their prior convictions were reversed on appeal. The court also rejected their remaining arguments.

See also
 List of United States Supreme Court cases, volume 163

References

External links
 
 

1896 in United States case law
United States Double Jeopardy Clause case law
United States Supreme Court cases
United States Supreme Court cases of the Fuller Court